Gide is a French surname. Notable people with the surname include:

André Gide (1869–1951), French author
Catherine Gide (1923–2013), French author and daughter of André Gide
Charles Gide (1847–1932), French economist and uncle of André Gide

See also
Gide Loyrette Nouel, European law firm
Gide River, river in Sweden
11298 Gide, main-belt asteroid
Guide (disambiguation)
Gid (disambiguation)

French-language surnames